D. Moni is an Indian politician. He was elected to Tamil Nadu legislative assembly three times from Vilavancode constituency. He won 1980, 1996, 2001 elections contesting as Communist Party of India (Marxist) candidate.

References

External links 
1980 Tamil Nadu Election Results, Election Commission of India
1996 Tamil Nadu Election Results, Election Commission of India
2001 Tamil Nadu Election Results, Election Commission of India

People from Kanyakumari district
Communist Party of India (Marxist) politicians from Tamil Nadu
Living people
Year of birth missing (living people)